The Khronos Group, Inc. is an open, non-profit, member-driven consortium of 170 organizations developing, publishing and maintaining royalty-free interoperability standards for 3D graphics, virtual reality, augmented reality, parallel computation, vision acceleration and machine learning. The open standards and associated conformance tests enable software applications and middleware to effectively harness authoring and accelerated playback of dynamic media across a wide variety of platforms and devices. The group is based in Beaverton, Oregon.

History 
The Khronos Group was founded in 2000 by companies including 3Dlabs, ATI, Discreet, Evans & Sutherland, Intel, SGI, and Sun Microsystems. Promoter members include AMD, Apple, Arm, Epic Games, Google, Huawei, Nokia, Imagination, intel, NVIDIA, Qualcomm, Samsung, Sony, Valve and Verisilcon. Its president is Neil Trevett.

Exploratory groups
Typically, Khronos first creates an exploratory group to gauge industry interest before creating a working group, which companies can join as members to assist in the development of the standard.

Specifications and working groups 
Each specification / standard is managed by a working group which is established to define the requirements, solicit input, discuss, and create a specification. There are currently 16 working groups.

Standards and other activities

Active standards 
 3D Commerce, universal guidelines, standards and certifications for 3D content creation and distribution in e-commerce
 ANARI, Analytic Rendering Interface for Data Visualization
 Camera, working on  interoperable camera API standards for embedded systems, a cooperation with the European Machine Vision Association (EMVA)
COLLADA, a file-format intended to facilitate interchange of 3D assets
 EGL, an interface between Khronos rendering APIs (such as OpenGL ES or OpenVG) and the underlying native platform window system
 glTF, a file format specification for 3D scenes and models
 KTX, a container file format for storing GPU-ready texture data
 NNEF reduces machine learning deployment fragmentation by enabling a rich mix of neural network training tools and inference engines to be used by applications across a diverse range of devices and platforms
 OpenCL, a cross-platform computation API
 OpenGL, a cross-platform computer graphics API
 OpenGL ES, a derivative of OpenGL for use on mobile and embedded systems, such as cell phones, portable gaming devices, and more
 OpenGL SC, a safety critical profile of OpenGL ES designed to meet the needs of the safety-critical market
 OpenVG, an API for accelerating processing of 2D vector graphics
 OpenVX, Hardware acceleration API for Computer Vision applications and libraries
 OpenXR, an open and royalty-free standard for virtual reality and augmented reality applications and devices
 SPIR, an intermediate compiler target for OpenCL and Vulkan
 SYCL, a single-source C++ DSEL for heterogeneous computing
 Vulkan, a low-overhead computer graphics API
 Vulkan SC, based on the existing Vulkan API specification to enable safety critical industries
 WebGL, a JavaScript binding to OpenGL ES within a browser on any platform supporting the OpenGL or OpenGL ES graphics standards

A timeline of API Specification ratification and releases can be found on the Khronos Group website.

Exploratory Groups 

 HetComm Exploratory, working on a new low level API to facilitate communication between hardware components in heterogenous systems
 ML | Machine Learning Forum, standards on machine learning
 SYCL, a single-source C++ DSEL for heterogeneous computing (already a standard)

Other activities 

 Member of the Metaverse Standards Forum, working on development of interoperability standards for an inclusive and open metaverse, in conjunction with other international standards organizations

Inactive standards 
 OpenML, an API for capturing, transporting, processing, displaying, and synchronizing digital media
 OpenKODE, an API for providing abstracted, portable access to operating system resources such as file systems, networks and math libraries
 OpenKCam, Advanced Camera Control API
 OpenMAX, a layered set of three programming interfaces of various abstraction levels, providing access to multimedia functionality
 OpenSL ES, an audio API tuned for embedded systems, standardizing access to features such as 3D positional audio and MIDI playback
 OpenWF, APIs for 2D graphics composition and display control
 StreamInput, an API for consistently handling input devices
 WebCL, a JavaScript binding to OpenCL within a browser

Members

Membership and contributions
Khronos members may contribute to the development of Khronos API specifications, vote at various stages before public deployment, and accelerate delivery of their platforms and applications through early access to specification drafts and conformance tests. To ensure that the standards are consistently implemented and to create a reliable platform for developers, any product that implements a Khronos API standard must pass conformance tests. An API Adopter Program enables companies to test their products for conformance. Membership in Khronos Group provides access to an IP framework designed to protect participant IP. Khronos members agree not to assert IP rights against adopters implementing Khronos specifications. The IP framework protects Khronos members from exposure to patent lawsuits and reduces the amount of IP that needs to be licensed from other group members.

Membership levels
Promoter: Full working group participation with voting rights, plus the right to designate a Director to the Khronos Board.
Contributor: Full working group participation with voting rights.
Non-Profit: Full working group participation. Available to registered non-profit organizations.
Academic: Full working group participation. Available to accredited academic institutions.
Associate: Full working group participation. Available to companies with up to 100 employees.

References

External links 
 
 

Application programming interfaces
Graphics libraries
Graphics standards
Standards organizations in the United States